Praeteropus is a genus of worm-skinks, smallish smooth-scaled burrowing lizards in the family Scincidae. The genus is endemic to the eastern half of Australia. The genus belongs to a clade in the Sphenomorphus group which contains such genera as Ctenotus and the close relatives Eulamprus and Gnypetoscincus (Austin & Arnold 2006).

Species
The following species are recognized as being valid.
Praeteropus auxilliger 
Praeteropus brevicollis  – short-necked worm-skink (NE Australia)
Praeteropus gowi  – speckled worm-skink (NE Australia)
Praeteropus monachus 

Nota bene: A binomial authority in parentheses indicates that the species was originally described in a genus other than Praeteropus.

References

 
Lizard genera
Taxa named by Mark Norman Hutchinson
Taxa named by Patrick J. Couper
Taxa named by Andrew P. Amey